The Scorcher is a 1927 American silent action film directed by Harry Joe Brown and starring Reed Howes, Thelma Parr and Hank Mann. It was distributed by the independent Rayart Pictures, the forerunner of Monogram Pictures.

Synopsis
A young mechanic has invented a potentially valuable new device, but he is unable to fund its development. When he learns about a cross-country motorcycle race with a cash prize he decides to enter.

Cast
 Reed Howes as Mike O'Malley
 Thelma Parr  		
 Hank Mann 	
 Harry Allen 
 Ernest Hilliard	
 Georgie Chapman

References

Bibliography
 Munden, Kenneth White. The American Film Institute Catalog of Motion Pictures Produced in the United States, Part 1. University of California Press, 1997.

External links
 

1920s American films
1927 films
1920s action films
1920s English-language films
American silent feature films
American action films
American black-and-white films
Films directed by Harry Joe Brown
Rayart Pictures films
Silent action films